The Bärenmädchen von Krupina ('Bear Girl of Krupina') ( 1767), was a feral child discovered in the mountains of Hungarian Krupina in 1767. She was referred to as Puella Karpfensis.

In 1767, people from Hont County stalked a bear to a cave in the mountains, where they discovered a naked girl. She was described as having been about eighteen years old, with brown skin, appeared frightened and had a wild manner. She reportedly lived only on raw meat, as a feral child.

She was forcibly taken from the cave and brought to Krupina, where she was imprisoned in a lunatic asylum.

References 

Feral children
18th-century births
18th-century Hungarian people
1767
Year of death unknown